The 20th San Diego Film Critics Society Awards were announced on December 14, 2015.

Winners and nominees

Best Film
Mad Max: Fury Road
Brooklyn
Ex Machina
Room
Spotlight

Best Director
George Miller – Mad Max: Fury Road
Lenny Abrahamson – Room
John Crowley – Brooklyn
Alejandro G. Iñárritu – The Revenant
Tom McCarthy – Spotlight

Best Male Actor
Leonardo DiCaprio – The Revenant
Bryan Cranston – Trumbo
Matt Damon – The Martian
Jason Segel – The End of the Tour
Jacob Tremblay – Room

Best Female Actor
Brie Larson – Room
Charlotte Rampling – 45 Years
Saoirse Ronan – Brooklyn
Charlize Theron – Mad Max: Fury Road
Alicia Vikander – Ex Machina

Best Male Supporting Actor
Tom Noonan – Anomalisa
RJ Cyler – Me and Earl and the Dying Girl
Paul Dano – Love & Mercy
Oscar Isaac – Ex Machina
Mark Rylance – Bridge of Spies

Best Female Supporting Actor
Jennifer Jason Leigh – The Hateful Eight
Olivia Cooke – Me and Earl and the Dying Girl
Helen Mirren – Trumbo
Kristen Stewart – Clouds of Sils Maria
Alicia Vikander – The Danish Girl

Best Original Screenplay
Jemaine Clement and Taika Waititi – What We Do in the Shadows
Noah Baumbach – Mistress America
Alex Garland – Ex Machina
Tom McCarthy and Josh Singer – Spotlight
Quentin Tarantino – The Hateful Eight

Best Adapted Screenplay
Emma Donoghue – Room
Drew Goddard – The Martian
Nick Hornby – Brooklyn
Charlie Kaufman – Anomalisa
Donald Margulies – The End of the Tour

Best Animated Film
Anomalisa
The Good Dinosaur
Inside Out
The Peanuts Movie
Shaun the Sheep Movie

Best Documentary
Cartel Land
Amy
He Named Me Malala
Meru
The Wrecking Crew

Best Foreign Language Film
Taxi
Goodnight Mommy
Phoenix
A Pigeon Sat on a Branch Reflecting on Existence

Best Cinematography
Roger Deakins – Sicario
Yves Bélanger – Brooklyn
Emmanuel Lubezki – The Revenant
John Seale – Mad Max: Fury Road
Dariusz Wolski – The Martian
White God

Best Editing
Margaret Sixel and Jason Ballantine – Mad Max: Fury Road
Michael Kahn – Bridge of Spies
Stephen Mirrione – The Revenant
Nathan Nugent – Room
Pietro Scalia – The Martian
Joe Walker – Sicario

Best Production Design
François Séguin – Brooklyn
Mark Digby – Ex Machina
Colin Gibson – Mad Max: Fury Road
Arthur Max – The Martian
Adam Stockhausen – Bridge of Spies

Best Sound Design
Mad Max: Fury Road
Ex Machina
Love & Mercy
The Martian
Sicario

Best Visual Effects
The Walk
Ex Machina
Jurassic World
Mad Max: Fury Road
The Martian

Best Use of Music in a Film
The Hateful Eight
Love & Mercy
Mad Max: Fury Road
Sicario
Straight Outta Compton

Breakthrough Artist
Jacob Tremblay
Abraham Attah
Sean Baker
Emory Cohen
Alicia Vikander

Best Ensemble
What We Do in the Shadows
The Big Short
The Hateful Eight
Inside Out
Spotlight
Straight Outta Compton

References

External links
 Official Site

2015
2015 film awards
2015 in American cinema